Mieleszczuk or Mileszczuk is a Polish-language surname, most probably of Ukrainian origin. The correspoinding Ukrainian-language surname is Meleshchuk  (Мелещук). Notable people with the surname include:
Olga Avigail Mieleszczuk, Poland-born Israeli singer
 (1939–2021), Polish handball player
Yeva Meleshchuk (born 2001), Ukrainian gymnast

See also
Melekhov
Meleshko
Melenchuk

References

Polish-language surnames
Ukrainian-language surnames